Charles "Chip" McGrath is an American journalist and editor who writes for the New York Times. He is a former writer and editor for The New Yorker and a former editor of The New York Times Book Review.

Bibliography

References

External links
Recent and archived work by Charles McGrath for The New York Times

Living people
Year of birth missing (living people)
The New Yorker editors
The New York Times editors